Michael Rizzo, is an American DJ, record producer and remixer from New York City, active since the early 1990s. He is well known for working with various artists such as Jennifer Green and Sun, all of whom scored hits on both Billboard's Hot Dance Club Play and Hot Dance Airplay charts.

He also achieved success on both charts in 2005 with the song "Can't Go On", which featured female singer Allie (Credited as "Mike Rizzo Presents Allie"). The music video for his song, "I Wanna Hold You", which he produced and co-wrote and featured recording artist Adam Barta.

From January to February 2010, Rizzo headlined pop singer-songwriter Utada's tour, Utada: In The Flesh 2010.

In December 2010, he was nominated for "Best Remixed Recording, Non-classical" at the 53rd Annual Grammy Awards, for the single "Orpheus (Quiet Carnival)" by Latin-jazz artist Sergio Mendes.

Mixed compilations
2002: NYC Dance Party
2003: Webster Hall's New York Dance, Vol. 6
2004: Trance Nation: America, Vol. 3
2005: ThriveMix 01

Selected remixes
Adam Lambert – Never Close Our Eyes
Akon featuring Colby O'Donis & Kardinal Offishall – Beautiful
Akon – Right Now (Na Na Na)
Alicia Madison-Superstar
Alyssa Rubino – Keep On Dancing
Anjulie – Boom
An-Ya – Candy Shop
An-Ya – Nightlife
Audio Playground – (A Little) Respect
Audio Playground – Shadows
Audio Playground – Emergency (Feat. Snoop Dogg)
Big Time Rush featuring New Boyz – Boyfriend
Boys Like Girls and Taylor Swift – Two is Better than One
Brandy – Full Moon
Brian Anthony featuring Ya Boy – Electricity
Britney Spears – 3
Britney Spears – Break the Ice
Britney Spears – If U Seek Amy
Britney Spears – Womanizer
Britney Spears – Hold It Against Me
Cheryl Cole – The Flood
Chris Brown featuring Benny Benassi – Beautiful People
Cobra Starship featuring Leighton Meester – Good Girls Go Bad
Danielle Bollinger – Kiss the Sky
Danity Kane – Damaged
David Archuleta – Crush
Deborah Cox – Play Your Part
Denine – What Happened To Love
Erika Jayne – Roller Coaster
Erika Jayne – Give You Everything
Freemasons featuring Katherine Ellis – When You Touch Me
J. Costa – Telling You Now
Jada – American Cowboy
Jason Derulo – In My Head
Jason Mraz – I'm Yours
Jewel – Serve the Ego
Joe Zangie – You Remind Me
Jordin Sparks – Battlefield
Jordin Sparks – One Step at a Time
Justin Timberlake featuring Beyoncé – Until the end of Time
Kaci Battaglia featuring Ludacris – Body Shots
Kamaliya – Arrhythmia
Katharine McPhee – Over It
Kelly Osbourne – One Word
Keri Hilson – Return the Favor
Kristinia DeBarge – Goodbye
Kwanza Jones – Think Again
Kylie Minogue – Can't Get You Out of My Head
L2 – Boys & Girls
L2 – Criminal in Bed
Leah Renee – IBF (Imaginary Boyfriend)
Lindsay Lohan – Bossy
Lionel Richie – Just Go
Livvi Franc – Automatik
Livvi Franc – Now I'm That Bitch
Lolene – Sexy People
Luther Vandross – I'd Rather
Madonna – Living for Love
Marcie – Midnight 
Marina – Searching For You
Marina Chello – Sideline
Mask Munkeys – This Night
Mayra Verónica-Freak Like Me
Mayra Verónica-If You Wanna Fly
Miranda Cosgrove – Dancing Crazy
Miranda Cosgrove – Kissin' U
Natasha Bedingfield – Touch (Natasha Bedingfield song)|Touch
Nick Lachey – Patience
Nikki Webster – Devilicious
Raquela – Tell It to My Heart
Ron Perkov – Miss You
Sa-Fire – Exotique
Sarah Atereth – Out of My Mind
Santana, Wyclef ft. Avicii – Dar Um Jeito (We Will Find A Way)World Cup 2014 Song 
Sergio Mendes  – Orpheus (Quiet Carnival)
Shontelle – T-Shirt
Tamia - Stranger In My House
Taylor Bright – Striped Socks
Usher – Moving Mountains
Utada – Come Back to Me
Utada – Dirty Desire
Wendy - Turn It Up
Willa Ford – I Wanna Be Bad
Zayra – V.I.P.
(We Are) Nexus – World Around Me

References

External links
 
 
 

Year of birth missing (living people)
Living people
American DJs
American dance musicians
American electronic musicians
American house musicians
Record producers from New York (state)
Club DJs
Nightlife in New York City
Remixers
American people of Italian descent
Electronic dance music DJs